The Offense-Defense All-American Bowl is an annual high school football all-star game typically held in early January, created to spotlight the nation's top high-school seniors. The game was originally hosted in the U.S. state of Florida, but the 2009 edition was moved to the Myrtle Beach area of South Carolina.

The inaugural game was played on January 4, 2007, at Lockhart Stadium in Fort Lauderdale, Florida. The next year the game moved to the Orange Bowl in Miami. The demolition of the Orange Bowl started in March 2008 so the 2009 edition was moved to Brooks Stadium, the campus stadium of Coastal Carolina University in Conway, South Carolina.

The game is in an East versus West format, with each team made up of 40 of the best high school seniors from across the nation as determined by Rivals.com. A national player of the year award is also presented the night prior to the game. The game was originally broadcast nationally to a prime-time audience thanks to broadcast partner ESPNU. The 2009 edition was increased to 88 total players, as selected from the Offense-Defense Top 100 list, a national recruit ranking system published by Sports Illustrated. Participants included 15 players ranked in the top-100 list.

The other big high school all-star games are the U.S. Army All-American Bowl played in San Antonio, Texas and the Under Armour All-America Game played in Orlando, Florida. Because all of these games host their events during the same week, they are in competition for players. A number of marquee players have participated in the O-D competition, including Cam Newton, Dez Bryant, Aaron Corp, Kodi Burns, Jarrett Lee, et al.

Game results

References

External links 
 
Athlon Sports feature

All-star games
High school football games in the United States
Recurring sporting events established in 2007